Dragon Haven is a fantasy novel by American writer Robin Hobb, the second novel in The Rain Wild Chronicles. In a blog post Robin Hobb wrote: "The untitled book I am working on now picks up the tale of the Tarman expedition in search of Kelsingra.  It’s my work in progress and threatens to be a long book!". Dragon Haven is written in third-person narrative from the viewpoint of several key characters. The narrative joins these separate threads together as a party of malformed dragons, their human keepers and other supporters are on a quest for the legendary Elderling city of Kelsingra.

Plot summary
The book opens where the previous book left off and we continue to follow the dragons, the keepers and the barge Tarman as they continue their trek up the river.

Characters
Alise Kincarron Finbok – one of the main protagonists, a self-taught scholar of dragons.
Thymara – one of the main protagonists, keeper to Sintara.
Sintara – one of the main protagonists, a blue dragon (Thymara's dragon).
Captain Leftrin  – one of the main protagonists, Captain of the barge Tarman.
Sedric  – one of the main protagonists, secretary to Hest Finbok, he is assigned to accompany Alise Finbok on her journey.
Tats – keeper of the dragon Fente, childhood friend of Thymara and a former slave.
Sylve – keeper of the dragon Mercor.
Rapskal – keeper of the dragon Heeby.
Greft – keeper of the dragon Kalo.  In his mid twenties, he is the oldest keeper and their unofficial leader.

Minor Characters
Carson Lupskip   – a hunter and an old friend of Leftrin's.
Davvie   – a hunter (bowman) and nephew to Carson.
Jess   – a hunter.
Ranculos   – a scarlet, male dragon kept by Harrikin.
Sestican   – an azure, male  dragon, kept by Lecter.
Mercor   – a golden dragon, tended by Sylve. Implied to have previously been the sea serpent Maulkin.
Heeby – a small red dragon queen, tended by Rapskal.
Jerd – keeper of the dragon Veras, she is implied to be promiscuous.
Fente   – a green dragon queen with a nasty temperament, tended by Tats.
Veras   – a green dragon queen, tended by  Jerd.
Arbuc   – Alum's silver-green dragon.
Kalo   – a blue-black male dragon, the largest of their clan, tended by Greft. 
Spit – an unclaimed, stunted  silver dragon with a wounded tail.
Relpda – an unclaimed, sickly copper dragon queen.
Tinder – a lavender dragon, tended by Nortel.
Baliper – a red dragon, tended by Warken.
Kase – a dragon keeper, cousin to Boxter.
Boxter – a dragon keeper, cousin to Kase.
Alum – a dragon keeper to Arbuc.
Nortel – a dragon keeper to Tinder; one of Greft's closest supporters.
Warken – keeper of the dragon Baliper.
Harrikin – a dragon keeper to Ranculos, foster brother to Lecter. He is the second oldest keeper at 20 years.
Lecter – a dragon keeper to Sestican, foster brother to Harrikin.
Skelly   – Deckhand on Tarman and niece of Leftrin.
Big Eider   – Deckhand on Tarman.
Hennesey   – Mate on Tarman.
Hest Finbok   – Husband of Alise Finbok, a rich and important Bingtown trader.
Swarge  – Tillerman of the barge Tarman.
Bellin  – Wife to Swarge, a poleman on Tarman.
Tarman  – A liveship river barge made from wizardwood.

References

2010 fantasy novels
Novels by Robin Hobb
Voyager Books books
2010 American novels
Novels about dragons